Sportmans Shores is an unincorporated community and census-designated place (CDP) in Mayes County, Oklahoma, United States. It was first listed as a CDP prior to the 2020 census.

The CDP is in northeastern Mayes County, on the north shore of the Neosho River at the upstream end of Lake Hudson.

Demographics

References 

Census-designated places in Mayes County, Oklahoma
Census-designated places in Oklahoma